Zopf or Züpfe ( in French and  in Italian) is a type of Swiss, Austrian, German and Bavarian bread made from white flour, milk, eggs, butter and yeast. The  is typically brushed with egg yolk, egg wash, or milk before baking, lending it its golden crust. It is baked in the form of a plait and traditionally eaten on Sunday mornings.
The German and French names are derived from the shape of the bread, meaning "braid" or "pigtail".

Swiss Zopf differs from other braid-shaped breads such as Challah or Hefekranz by way of being unsweetened.

See also
 Cardamom bread
 Panaret
 Pulla
 Vánočka

References
 

Braided egg breads
Swiss breads
Christmas food
Austrian breads
German breads